Gleb Sergeyevich Bakshi (born 12 November 1995) is a Russian boxer. He is an Honored Master of Sports of Russia.

Bakshi won the gold medal at the 2019 AIBA World Boxing Championships.

References

1995 births
Living people
Krymchaks
Russian male boxers
Sportspeople from Simferopol
Middleweight boxers
AIBA World Boxing Championships medalists
World middleweight boxing champions
European Games competitors for Russia
Boxers at the 2019 European Games
Boxers at the 2020 Summer Olympics
Medalists at the 2020 Summer Olympics
Olympic bronze medalists for the Russian Olympic Committee athletes
Olympic medalists in boxing
Olympic boxers of Russia
Naturalised citizens of Russia
Russian people of Ukrainian descent
21st-century Russian people